The State Immunity Act 1978 is an Act of the Parliament of the United Kingdom which was passed to implement the European Convention on State Immunity of 1972 into British law. The doctrine of absolute state immunity was changed to one of restricted immunity, whereby a foreign state could be sued in the British courts for some certain activities, usually of a commercial nature.

In 1998 the defence attempted to use it during Augusto Pinochet's arrest and trial, but Lord Nicholls said that the Act flouted a battery of international legislation on human rights abuses to which Britain is a signatory, and would have meant, according to the arguments of Pinochet's legal team, that British law would have protected even Adolf Hitler.

In June 2006 the law was used to dismiss an appeal by three Britons (Sandy Mitchell, Les Walker and Ron Jones) and a Canadian (William Sampson) who were convicted and imprisoned for car bombings and illicit alcohol trading in Saudi Arabia.  The Law Lords upheld an appeal by the government of Saudi Arabia against the four men who wished to sue the Saudi government for damages relating to alleged torture. Despite the ruling, the four continue to maintain that they were mistreated by Saudi officials both before and after they were jailed in November 2000. They were released from prison in 2003 on royal pardon.

In 2017 the Court of Appeal held that the employment rights of two Sudanese embassy workers were within the scope of the EU-derived Working Time Regulations; a decision subsequently affirmed by the Supreme Court at UKSC 62. Under UK domestic law, sections 4 and 16 the State Immunity Act 1978 should have operated to protect the embassies’ immunity from actions arising from contracts of employment, thus barring the employees' claims. However, once it was established that the matter fell within EU law, Article 47 of the Charter, granting the right to a fair trial, gave the Court of Appeal and the Supreme Court the power to 'protect' that right to the extent of overriding the inconsistent provisions of the 1978 Act.

References

External links

 Summary of important sections of the Act
 House of Lords judgment in Holland v. Lampen-Wolfe

Sovereign immunity
United Kingdom Acts of Parliament 1978